Solomon Yue, Jr. (born May 7, 1959) is an American Republican Party activist and businessperson. He is vice chairman and CEO of the lobbying group Republicans Overseas and the national committeeman of the Republican Party of Oregon.

Early life and business activities 
An immigrant from China, Yue became a businessman in the United States, based in Salem, Oregon.

Republican Party activities 
Since 2000, Yue has been a Republican National Committee member from Oregon. As a Republican committeeman, Yue is part of the party's right wing, closely allied with the archconservative Jim Bopp, an Indiana RNC committeeman. In 2009, Yue and Bopp co-founded an RNC "conservative steering committee" and co-drafted a resolution that accused Republican President George W. Bush of supporting "socialism" by endorsing the federal rescue of the financial industry and auto industry, and criticized then President-elect Barack Obama for his economic stimulus plan. Yue also criticized Bush for his support of the Medicare Part D prescription-drug benefit. Yue later supported an RNC resolution that would require Republicans candidates to meet a purity test before obtaining party support, and another resolution in 2009 that claimed that the Democratic Party was "dedicated to restructuring American society along socialist ideals" and sought to require Republicans to label the Democratic Party as a "socialist" party. Yue clashed with RNC chairman Michael Steele and Oregon Republican Party chairman Bob Tiernan, who opposed many of his proposals. Yue and Bopp spearheaded an internal party fight to oust Steele from the national chairmanship. In 2010, Tiernan accused Yue of stirring up discord within the RNC and Oregon Republican Party; Yue, in turn, accused Tiernan of requiring "absolute loyalty."

Yue was a delegate to the 2008 Republican National Convention, where he praised the party's ticket of John McCain and Sarah Palin. He was Oregon superdelegate to the 2012 Republican National Convention, pledged to Mitt Romney.

In April 2016, as a member of the Republican National Committee's rules committee, Yue proposed a change to the party's procedural rules that would make it more difficult for Republican leaders to place in nomination, at the 2016 Republican National Convention, the name of a candidate not already in the race. The debate over the proposal occurred as Donald Trump and Ted Cruz battled for the presidential nomination, raising the prospect of a contested convention. Yue wrote a 1,300-word email accusing RNC Chairman Reince Priebus and other party leader of "institutional tyranny" over their opposition to his proposal. The rules committee rejected Yue's proposal to change the rules. After Trump became the presumptive nominee of the Republican Party, Yue maneuvered to ensure Trump's nomination at the convention over the last-ditch objection of anti-Trump Republican holdouts.

After a pro-Donald Trump mob attacked the U.S. Capitol in January 2021, Yue and most other Republican Party figures remained loyal to Trump, and sponsored a state Republican party resolution condemning the ten House Republicans who voted in favor of Trump's impeachment. Yue played a key role in getting the Oregon Republican Party to adopt a resolution falsely claiming that the storming of the Capitol was a "false flag" intended "to discredit President Trump, his supporters, and all conservative Republicans." In March 2021, Yue also appeared on a YouTube show hosted by Greyson Arnold, who has praised Nazi Germany and espoused racism and anti-Semitism; on the show, Yue praised far-right and white nationalist activist Nick Fuentes, saying that Fuentes should have a role in picking Republican candidates. After his appearance attracted scrutiny, Yue said that he was unaware of the views of Arnold and Fuentes at the time of his appearance on the show.

References 

1959 births
Living people
Politicians from Shanghai
American people of Chinese descent
Oregon Republicans
Businesspeople from Oregon
Businesspeople from Shanghai
Republican National Committee members